Vincent Dreyer (born 8 October 1978) is a Namibian rugby union fullback. He played with the Namibia national rugby union team at the 2003 Rugby World Cup.

References

1978 births
Living people
Namibian rugby union players
Namibia international rugby union players
Rugby union fullbacks